Lineburg is an unincorporated community in Morgan County in the U.S. state of West Virginia's Eastern Panhandle. Lineburg lies on the western flanks of Sideling Hill on the Turkey Foot Bend of the Potomac River. The community originally served as a station on the Baltimore and Ohio Railroad, but has since become a location for vacationing weekenders from the Washington, D.C. area.

References

Unincorporated communities in Morgan County, West Virginia
Unincorporated communities in West Virginia
Baltimore and Ohio Railroad
West Virginia populated places on the Potomac River